The Gloucestershire Women's cricket team is the women's representative cricket team for the English historic county of Gloucestershire. They play their home games at various grounds across the county, and are captained by Alice Hill. In 2019, they played in Division Three of the final season of the Women's County Championship, and in 2021 won the South West Group of the Women's Twenty20 Cup. They are partnered with the regional side Western Storm.

History

1937–2006: Early History
Gloucestershire Women played their first recorded match in 1935, against Hampshire. Two years later, they drew a match against Australia as part of their tour of England. Since then, they played various one-off matches against other county sides and Second XIs.

2007– : Women's County Championship
In 2007, Gloucestershire Women joined the County Challenge Cup, the feeder tier of the Women's County Championship, finishing 3rd in their group. The following season, they joined the full Championship, in Division Five South & West, again finishing third. Gloucestershire were promoted to Division Three in 2012, and except a brief spell in Division Four in 2015, have played there ever since. In 2017 they just missed out on promotion to Division Two, losing a play-off match to Essex by 6 wickets, after topping Division 3B. Meanwhile, in the Women's Twenty20 Cup, Gloucestershire gained two early promotions in the Midlands & North region in 2010 and 2011. After the competition took on a nationwide format in 2015, Gloucestershire have mainly played in Division Three, with brief spells in both Divisions Four and Two. In 2021, they competed in the South West Group of the Twenty20 Cup, and won the group, going unbeaten with 4 wins and 4 matches abandoned due to rain. Gloucestershire batter Chloe Skelton was the fifth-highest run-scorer across the competition, with 201 runs. In 2022, they finished bottom of Group 3 of the Twenty20 Cup.

Players

Current squad
Based on appearances in the 2022 season.  denotes players with international caps.

Notable players
Players who have played for Gloucestershire and played internationally are listed below, in order of first international appearance (given in brackets):

 Fran Wilson (2010)

Seasons

Women's County Championship

Women's Twenty20 Cup

Honours
 Women's Twenty20 Cup:
 Group winners (1) – 2021

See also
 Gloucestershire County Cricket Club
 Western Storm

References

Cricket in Gloucestershire
Women's cricket teams in England